Richard Brian Pilon (born April 30, 1968) is a Canadian former ice hockey player of Métis heritage. He was drafted 143rd overall in the 1986 NHL Entry Draft by the New York Islanders. Playing as a defenceman, Pilon played for the Islanders, New York Rangers and St. Louis Blues during his 15-year NHL career. He is the former coach of the Weyburn Red Wings of The SJHL.

Playing career
Pilon was born in Saskatoon, Saskatchewan. He made his debut in the 1988–89 season, playing 62 games, recording 14 assists and 242 penalty minutes for the New York Islanders as a left shooting defenseman. He would play 10 seasons for the Islanders before being put on waivers by the team. He was then picked up on December 1, 1999, by the New York Rangers. Due to injury, he played parts of two seasons for the Rangers, before he was traded to the San Jose Sharks for a seventh round draft pick, days before he became an unrestricted free agent in 2001. He was then signed by the St. Louis Blues on July 10, 2001. He played eight games for the Blues before he suffered a broken left wrist in a game against the Rangers that subsequently ended his NHL career.

The Kevin Stevens incident
On May 14, 1993, game seven of the Patrick Division finals between the New York Islanders and the favored defending Stanley Cup champion Pittsburgh Penguins saw not only one of the greatest upsets in NHL playoff history (with Islanders' overtime goal by David Volek), but one of the worst freak accidents to ever occur on the ice.

Early in the first period, the puck went into the Islanders' corner. The Penguins' star power forward, Kevin Stevens, skated in hard and attempted to hit Pilon who was battling for the puck, but instead was met by Pilon's visor which knocked Stevens unconscious in mid-air. The unprotected fall left Stevens to smash his face on the ice upon impact. Stevens lay motionless on the ice for several seconds, a pool of blood forming around his head, before the team trainer attended to him. Stevens was carted off the ice in a stretcher with a neck brace. He required immediate surgery on his crushed face to repair injuries that ended up being a broken sinus bone and nose, as well as many facial lacerations and bruises. Stevens' face required over one-hundred stitches that left him unrecognizable, even to his own family, for the next few weeks until the swelling went down. Fortunately for Stevens, the injury did not end his career, and he played 10 more seasons in the NHL.

PPG Paints Arena statue
Pilon and Jeff Norton are depicted as the two defenders Mario Lemieux skates between in a 4,700-pound bronze statue unveiled on March 7, 2012, at PPG Paints Arena (then called Consol Energy Center) in Pittsburgh, Pennsylvania.

Personal life
Pilon was born in Saskatoon, but grew up in St. Louis, Saskatchewan. His son Garrett was drafted by the Washington Capitals in the third round of the 2016 NHL Entry Draft.

Pilon currently resides in Saskatoon with his wife and two children where he works with a uranium mining company. After battling drugs and alcohol over the course of his career, Pilon has been sober for several years and volunteers in a program that uses hockey to encourage children ages eight to 14 to avoid substance abuse.

Career statistics

Regular season and playoffs

Awards
 WHL East Second All-Star Team – 1988

References

External links
 
 Hockey Goon Profile

1968 births
Living people
Canadian expatriate ice hockey players in the United States
Canadian ice hockey defencemen
Capital District Islanders players
Ice hockey people from Saskatchewan
Métis sportspeople
New York Islanders draft picks
New York Islanders players
New York Rangers players
Prince Albert Raiders players
St. Louis Blues players
Salt Lake Golden Eagles (IHL) players
Sportspeople from Saskatoon